Caesium auride is the inorganic compound with the formula CsAu. It is the Cs+ salt of the unusual Au− anion.

Preparation and reactions
CsAu is obtained by heating a stoichiometric mixture of caesium and gold. The two metallic-yellow liquids react to give a transparent yellow product. Despite being a compound of two metals, CsAu lacks metallic properties since it is a salt with localized charges; it instead behaves as a semiconductor with band gap 2.6 eV.

The compound hydrolyzes readily, yielding caesium hydroxide, metallic gold, and hydrogen.

2 CsAu + 2 H2O → 2 CsOH + 2 Au + H2

The solution in liquid ammonia is brown, and the ammonia adduct  is blue; the latter has ammonia molecules intercalated between layers of the CsAu crystal parallel to the (110) plane. Solutions undergo metathesis with tetramethylammonium loaded ion exchange resin to give tetramethylammonium auride.

References

Further reading
 —includes photograph of the compound.

Gold compounds
Caesium compounds
Semiconductor materials
Caesium chloride crystal structure